A gourmand is a lover of good food and drink.

Gourmand may also refer to:

 Gourmand (fragrance), a genre of modern perfume 
 Gourmand syndrome, a rare medical condition
 Café gourmand, a French culinary concept